Saint Joachim Reading a Book is a painting by the Flemish artist Michaelina Wautier. It was painted some time in the 1650s. The painting is in the Kunsthistorisches Museum, Vienna.

References 

Paintings by Michaelina Wautier
1650s paintings
Books in art